Fedayeen ( fidāʼīyīn  "self-sacrificers") is an Arabic term used to refer to various military groups willing to sacrifice themselves for a larger campaign.

Etymology
The term fedayi is derived from Arabic:  fidā'īyūn , literally meaning: "those who sacrifice themselves".

Per country

Armenia 

Armenian fedayi groups acted as irregular militia troops to defend their lands during the Hamidian massacres and the CUP's genocidal policies.

Egypt
During the 1940s, groups of Egyptian civilians formed fedayeen groups to contest the British occupation of Egypt, which by then was limited to the region against the Suez Canal. The British Army had established numerous military outposts around the canal zone, which many Egyptians viewed as a violation of their national sovereignty. This opposition was not supported by the Egyptian government, though these fedayeen groups held broad support among the general public in Egypt.

In 1951 "mobs of "irregular self-sacrificers, or fedayeen", some "armed by the Muslim Brotherhood", attacked British Army outposts located in the Suez Canal Zone.

Eritrea
Known by the same name, they operated inside the capital city, Asmara, during the last 15–20 years of the armed struggle in Eritrea against the Ethiopian government. They operated secretly and eliminated people who were considered dangerous to the struggle to gain Eritrean independence, which lasted from 1961 to 1991.

Iran
Two very different groups used the name Fedayeen in recent Iranian history. The Fadayan-e Islam has been described as "one of the first real Islamic fundamentalist organizations in the Muslim world". It was founded by Navab Safavi in 1946 for the purpose of demanding strict application of the sharia and assassinating those it believed to be apostates and enemies of Islam. After several successful assassinations it was suppressed in 1956 and several leading members were executed.

A Marxist-leaning activist group known as the Fedayeen (Fedayân in Persian language) was founded in 1971 and based in Tehran. Operating between 1971 and 1983, the Fedayeen carried out a number of political assassinations in the course of the struggle against the Shah of Iran, after which the group was suppressed.

In 1979 the Iranian People's Fedâi Guerrillas split from the Organization of Iranian People's Fedaian (Majority).

Iraq
Beginning in 1995, Iraq established a paramilitary group known as the Fedayeen Saddam, loyal to the then president Saddam Hussein and the Ba'athist government. The name was chosen to imply a connection with the Palestinian Fedayeen. In July 2003, personnel records for the Fedayeen organization in Iraq were discovered in the basement of the former Fedayeen headquarters in east Baghdad near the Rasheed Air Base. At the time of the discovery, the Assyrian Democratic Movement occupied the building; after an extensive cataloging process, an operation was conducted in Baghdad resulting in several individuals being detained.

Nizari Ismaili state

Hassan-i-Sabbah (c. 1050–1124), who founded the Nizari Ismaili state in Persia and Syria, first coined the term to refer to the Hashshashins. Fidāʼīyīn is the plural of fidāʼī, which means "sacrifice." It is widely understood as "those willing to sacrifice themselves for God". The group carried out an armed struggle against the Seljuk Empire.

Ottoman Empire and Turkey
The Committee of Union and Progress conducted assassination campaigns and called its assassins "fedai", which according to Mehmed Selahaddin was derived from Greek  meaning "this is the tie of Greek friendship".

Within the context of Turkish history, the term fedailer is often associated with the Late Ottoman or Early Republican irregular forces, known as: Kuva-yi Milliye. Those most committed Unionists who would enforce the Central Committee's regime were also known as fedailer.

Palestinians

Palestinian fedayeen are militants of a nationalist orientation from among the Palestinian people. The fedayeen made efforts to infiltrate territory in Israel in order to strike military as well as civilian targets in the aftermath of the 1948 Arab–Israeli War.

Members of these groups were living in the Gaza Strip and the West Bank or in neighboring Lebanon and Syria. Prior to Israel's seizure of the West Bank and Gaza Strip in the Six-Day War, these areas, originally destined for a Palestinian state, were under Jordanian and Egyptian occupation, respectively. After Israel's Operation Black Arrow in 1955, the Palestinian fedayeen were incorporated into an Egyptian army unit.

During this time (1948 – c. 1980), the word entered international usage and was frequently used in the Arab media as a synonym for great militancy. In the Israeli Hebrew press of this time the term ( fada'iun) had highly negative connotations and was associated with terrorism. Since the mid-1960s and the rise of more organized and specific militant groups, such as the Palestine Liberation Organization, the word has fallen out of usage, but not in the historical context.

See also
 Arab–Israeli conflict
 Mujahideen
 Palestinian political violence

Explanatory notes 
Derives from the word  fidāʼ, which means redemption. Literally, someone who redeems himself by risking or sacrificing his life. The pronunciation varies for the first vowel, for example , hence the transcription difference.

References

External links
 Armenian Fedayeen: Armenian History

Arab groups
Arabic words and phrases
Islamic terrorism